Andrei Dmitriev is the name of

 Andrei Dmitriev (athlete) (born 1990), Russian runner in the 2009 IAAF World Cross Country Championships – Junior men's race
 Andrei Dmitriyev (football coach) (born 1965), Russian football coach
 Andrei Dmitriev (politician) (born 1979), Russian politician (National Bolshevik Party, The Other Russia) and publicist
 Andrei Dmitriev (writer) (born 1956), Russian writer
 Andrey Dmitriyeu (born 1981), Belarusian politician and social activist